Introspective is the fourth studio album recorded by Amber Smith. The album was recorded at the Podium Studios in Budapest, Hungary in 2007. The album was mixed by Chris Brown, who previously worked on Radiohead's The Bends album, and it was mastered at Foon Mastering Studios in Belgium. The album was released by the Lithuanian label M.P.3 International as CD and digitally.

The presentation of the album took a place on 29 February 2008 in the music club L'Amour, Vilnius, the capital of Lithuania. Eventually the album won the award of the best alternative record in Hungary in 2009. During the campaign of the album the videos were filmed for the songs Introspective and Select All/Delete All.

On 1 December 2007, the first single, Introspective, was released from the eponymous album.

Track listing
"Introspective"
"1980"
"Coded"
"Select All/Delete All"
"Brazil"
"Hectic"
"Treading Water"
"Welcome to CIA"
"Simon Says"
"Father"
"My Final Plea"

Personnel
The following people contributed to Introspective:

Amber Smith
 Oszkár Ács - bass
 Bence Bátor - drums
 Zoltán Kőváry - guitars
 Imre Poniklo - vocals and guitars

Additional musicians and production
 Dávid Vesztergombi - strings

References

External links
 Introspective at Amber Smith's webpage

2008 albums
Amber Smith (band) albums